Iration is the sixth studio album by the American reggae band Iration, released on May 18, 2018.

Track listing

CD release

LP release
The LP Release of the album is notable for including the track "L.I.O.N. (Like It Or Not)" which was exclusively released for the LP and made available for streaming through Spotify. In the respective releases, the track is listed between "Last To Know" and "Energy"

Charts

References

External links
Iration

2018 albums
Reggae albums by American artists